Albertha is a township in Dickey County, North Dakota, United States.  The population was 23 at the 2010 census.

References

Dickey County, North Dakota